The Melon Music Award for Album of the Year is an award presented by South Korean entertainment company Kakao M at the annual Melon Music Awards, with its inaugural online ceremony in 2005. Award winners are based on data collected from the Melon music platform and honors artists who have had exceptional performance during the recording year. Since 2009, it has comprised one of the daesang (grand prize) awards given at the event, alongside Song of the Year, Artist of the Year, and later Record of the Year—the latter of which was introduced during the 2018 ceremony. Album of the Year has currently been given to nine artists. 

From 2005 to 2008, award winners were announced online, although there was no album accolade given in 2007 or 2008. The ceremony was officially held offline in Seoul starting with the 2009 awards, with Album of the Year becoming one of the ceremony's grand prizes. The ceremony has been held at various venues throughout Seoul. As of 2021, the criteria for the Album of the Year accolade currently consist of a breakdown of 60% digital sales and streaming figures, 20% evaluation from a panel of judges, and 20% online voting. 

BTS is the most awarded artist in the category, having won four times in 2016, 2018, 2019 and 2020. Three artists share the title for the second most awards received with two each: 2NE1 won for To Anyone (2010) and 2nd Mini Album (2011), Busker Busker won for 1st Album (2012) and 2nd Album (2013), while IU won the award for Palette (2017) and Lilac (2021). IU and BTS are the most nominated artists in the category, having been nominated six times. They are followed by Big Bang, Exo and 2NE1 with the second-most nominations, with four each. G-Dragon, IU and Kim Jong-kook are the only soloists to have received the award while 2NE1 is the only awarded female group.

Winners and nominees

From 2005 to 2008, the Melon Music Award winners were announced online. In 2007 and 2008, there was no album accolade announced by the event committee.

The Melon Music Awards were held in a traditional live format for the first time since 2009, with Album of the Year consisting of one the three daesang prizes, alongside Artist of the Year and Song of the Year. Because of this, the 2009 event is regarded as the first "official" ceremony in the show's history.

Records

Most nominations

Most awards

See also

 Mnet Asian Music Award for Album of the Year

Notes

References

External links
 Melon Music Awards official site

Melon Music Awards
Album awards